The 17027 / 28 Hundry Express is an Express train belonging to Indian Railways South Central Railway zone that runs between  and   in India.

It operates as train number 17027 from Hyderabad Deccan to Kurnool City  and as train number 17028 in the reverse direction serving the states of  Telangana & Andhra Pradesh.

Coaches
The 17027 / 28 Hundry Express has 15 general unreserved (Now 2S), One AC Chair Car & two SLR (seating with luggage rake) coaches . It does not carry a pantry car.

As is customary with most train services in India, coach composition may be amended at the discretion of Indian Railways depending on demand.

Service

Routing
The 17027 / 28 Hundry Express runs from Hyderabad Deccan via , Gadwal to Kurnool City.

Traction
As the route is going to electrification, a Gooty-based WDM-3D diesel locomotive pulls the train to its destination.

References

External links
17027 Hundry Express at India Rail Info
17028 Hundry Express at India Rail Info

Named passenger trains of India
Transport in Secunderabad
Rail transport in Telangana
Rail transport in Andhra Pradesh
Transport in Kurnool district
Express trains in India